Darren McClennan (born 21 October 1965) is a successful former New Zealand soccer player who frequently represented his country in the 1980s and 1990s.

He was not known for his delicate touch but his all-action style built on pace and aggression brought him a lot of goals and silverware.

International career
The striker collected 53 caps, scoring 12 goals, in official FIFA internationals and played his last game for the All Whites in June 1997 against Papua New Guinea.

Achievements

New Zealand Player of the Year: 1
 1994

Chatham Cup winner's medal:
1986

References

External links

1965 births
Living people
Association footballers from Auckland
Association football forwards
New Zealand association footballers
New Zealand international footballers
1996 OFC Nations Cup players
North Shore United AFC players
Waitakere City FC players